Robert Firth (May 12, 1918 – January 4, 1984) was a United States district judge of the United States District Court for the Central District of California.

Education and career

Born in Harrison, New Jersey, Firth received an Artium Baccalaureus degree from Indiana University in 1940 and was in the United States Navy as a Lieutenant during World War II, from 1941 to 1945. He received a Bachelor of Laws from Harvard Law School in 1948, remaining a United States Naval Reserve as a  Lieutenant from 1946 to 1952. He was in private practice in Los Angeles, California from 1949 to 1950, and was in private practice in Pomona, California from 1950 to 1967. He was a judge of the Los Angeles County Superior Court from 1967 to 1974, also serving as a lecturer at the University of La Verne College of Law in La Verne, California from 1971 to 1973.

Federal judicial service

On February 6, 1974, Firth was nominated by President Richard Nixon to a seat on the United States District Court for the Central District of California was vacated by Judge Charles Hardy Carr. Firth was confirmed by the United States Senate on March 1, 1974, and received his commission on March 8, 1974. He assumed senior status due to a certified disability on October 31, 1979, and served in that capacity until his death on January 4, 1984.

References

Sources
 

1918 births
1984 deaths
Indiana University alumni
Harvard Law School alumni
California state court judges
Judges of the United States District Court for the Central District of California
United States district court judges appointed by Richard Nixon
20th-century American judges
United States Navy officers
People from Harrison, New Jersey
United States Navy personnel of World War II